Guillaume-Louis Cottrau (10 August 1797 in Paris – 31 October 1847 in Naples) was a French composer and music publisher.

Arrived in Naples with his father who served Joachim Murat, the King of Naples, Cottrau undertook the publication of Passatempi Musicali, a collection of Neapolitan songs, some of his composition. Thanks to this, the canzone Napoletana crossed the borders of the kingdom and reached great diffusion and popularity abroad.

One of his themes was taken up by Franz Liszt for his Tarentelle napolitaine included in the Années de pèlerinage.

Guglielmo was the father of composer Teodoro Cottrau.

References

External links 
 La ricciolella (Cottrau, Guillaume Louis) on IMSLP
 Lu rammaglietto (Cottrau, Guillaume Louis) on IMSLP
 Guillaume Louis Cottrau on Musopen
 Guillaume Louis Cottrau on Associated Chamber Music Players

Musicians from Paris
1797 births
1847 deaths
19th-century French musicologists
19th-century French musicians
19th-century musicologists